Tmesisternus sepicanus is a species of beetle in the family Cerambycidae. It was described by Kriesche in 1926.

References

sepicanus
Beetles described in 1926